Chara may refer to:

Places
Chara (rural locality), a rural locality (a selo) in Zabaykalsky Krai, Russia
Chara Airport, an airport in Russia near the rural locality
Chara (river), a river in Russia
Chara Sands, a sanded area in Siberia, Russia

Science

Chara (alga), a genus of algae in the family Characeae
Chara (moth), a genus of moths in the family Noctuidae
CHARA array, a telescope
Beta Canum Venaticorum or Chara, a star
Chara or Southern dogs, a constellation including Beta Canum Venaticorum and Cor Caroli

Other uses
Chara (surname)
 Chara, a character in the video game Undertale
Chara (singer), Japanese singer
Chara people, ethnic group in the Southern Nations, Nationalities, and Peoples' Region of Ethiopia
Chara language, the language of the Chara people
USS Chara (AKA-58), a 1944 Achernar class attack cargo ship
Chara (magazine), a Japanese Yaoi/Shōjo magazine

See also
Shugo Chara!, a 2008 manga series
Novaya Chara, an urban-type settlement in Zabaykalsky Krai, Russia
To kafe tis Charas, a Greek sitcom
Ceará (disambiguation)
Chaka (disambiguation)
Chakra (disambiguation)
Chala (disambiguation)
Char (disambiguation)
Charabanc,  a type of vehicle common in Britain during the early part of the 20th century
 Charas (disambiguation)
Chard (disambiguation)
Charm (disambiguation)
Chart (disambiguation)